Glenea apicespinosa is a species of beetle in the family Cerambycidae. It was described by Stephan von Breuning in 1956. It is known from Laos and China.

References

apicespinosa
Beetles described in 1956